Tavakkolabad (also Romanized as Tavakkolābād) is a village in Bayaz Rural District, in the Central District of Anar County, Kerman Province, Iran. At the 2006 census, its population was 38, in 9 families.

References 

Populated places in Anar County